Eduardo Fernández Aldana (born 4 March 1990) is a Mexican footballer who currently plays for Venados.

References

External links

1990 births
Living people
People from Mérida, Yucatán
Footballers from Yucatán
Mexican footballers
Murciélagos FC footballers
C.F. Mérida footballers
Coras de Nayarit F.C. footballers
Venados F.C. players
Association football midfielders